Justin Hires (born June 24, 1985) is an American actor and stand-up comedian. Hires is known for portraying Detective James Carter on the CBS television series Rush Hour, Juario in 21 Jump Street, and Wilt Bozer in the 2016 reboot series of MacGyver.

Early years
Hires was born on June 24, 1985 in St. Petersburg, Florida to Barbara Hires, who worked as an Area 2 superintendent for the schools of Pinellas County. Hires attended Gibbs High School in St. Petersburg, Florida where he graduated. Hires attended and graduated from Clark Atlanta University with a Bachelor of Arts degree. He was also in many different Vines.

Career
Hires landed minor roles in two feature films: Stomp the Yard and The Gospel. In 2015, Hires joined the cast of the television series Rush Hour as Detective James Carter. In June 2016, Hires was cast in the MacGyver reboot series as Wilt Bozer.

Filmography

References

External links

 

1985 births
Living people
American male film actors
African-American male actors
African-American male comedians
American male comedians
21st-century American comedians
People from St. Petersburg, Florida
21st-century African-American people
20th-century African-American people